Lily is a feminine given name usually derived from lily, the flower. The name became particularly popular along with other flower names for girls during the 1800s and early 1900s. The lily also has associations with and has been symbolic of innocence and purity in Christian art.  Names beginning with or containing the letter L have also been particularly fashionable for girls. It is also occasionally used as a diminutive for other names such as Elizabeth.

The popularity of the name increased steadily in most countries in western Europe and English-speaking countries during the late 20th and early 21st centuries. 

Related or associated names include, among others, Lillian, Lilia,  Lilika, Liliana, Lilibet, Lilibeth, Lilja,  Lilith, and Tigerlily.

People

 Lily Abegg (1901–1974), Swiss journalist
 Lily Addison (1885–1982), Australian tennis player
 Lily Ah Toy (1917–2001), Australian pioneer and businesswoman
 Lily Aldridge (born 1985), American fashion model
 Lily Allen (born 1985), English singer, songwriter, actress and author
 Lily Atkinson (1866–1921), New Zealand temperance campaigner, suffragist, and feminist
 Lily Auchincloss (1922–1996), American journalist, philanthropist, and art collector
 Lily Beaurepaire (1892–1979), Australian swimmer and diver
 Lily Benson (born 1986), American artist and filmmaker
 Lily Berglund (1928–2010), Swedish singer
 Lily Blatherwick (1854–1934), English painter
 Lily Bloom, French actress
 Lily Bouwmeester (1901–1993), Dutch theater and film actress
 Lily Braun (1865–1916), German feminist writer
 Lily Brayton (1876–1953), English actress
 Lily Brett (born 1946), Australian novelist
 Lily Brown (born 1981), American poet
 Lily Burana, American writer
 Lily Butters (1895–1980), Canadian philanthropist
 Lily Cahill (1888–1955), American actress
 Lily Carlstedt (1926–2005), Danish javelin thrower
 Lily Castel (born 1937), Belgian singer
 Lily Chakravarty (born 1941), Indian film actress
 Lily Chan (born 1983), Chinese singer
 Lily Chitty (1893–1979), British archaeologist and independent scholar
 Lily Chung (born 1964), Hong Kong based actress
 Lily Cole (born 1988), English fashion model
 Lily Collins (born 1989), English-American actress and model
 Lily D'Ambrosio (born 1964), Australian politician
 Lily Dampier (died 1915), Australian actor of stage and screen
 Lily Dick (born 1999), Australian women's national rugby sevens team player
 Lily Donaldson (born 1987), British fashion model
 Lily Dougall (1858–1923), Canadian author and feminist
 Lily E. Kay (1947–2000), Polish-American science historian
 Lily Eberwein (1900–1980), Sarawakian nationalist and women's right activist
 Lily Elise (born 1991), American singer-songwriter
 Lily Elsie (1886–1962), English actress and singer
 Lily Eskelsen García (born 1955), American teacher and trade union leader
 Lily Fabiola de la Rosa (born 1970), Mexican politician
 Lily Fayol (1914–1999), French singer
 Lily Franky (born 1963), Japanese illustrator, writer, and actor
 Lily Frost (contemporary), Canadian singer
 Lily Furedi (1896–1969), Hungarian-American artist
 Lily Garafulic (1914–2012), Chilean sculptor, Generation of 40 (Generación del 40) artists member, and museum director
 Lily Gladstone (born 1986), American actress
 Lily Goddard (1916–2002), Austrian author and designer
 Lily Gower (1877–1959), Welsh croquet player
 Lily Ann Granderson (1816–after 1870), American historical educator
 Lily Haass (1886–1964), American YWCA worker in Shanghai, China
 Lily Halpern (born 1991), American performer and singer
 Lily Hanbury (1873–1908), English stage performer
 Lily Hevesh, American YouTuber and domino artist
 Lily Hoshino, Japanese manga artist
 Lily Ho Ngo Yee (born 1988), Hong Kong actress
 Lily Hoy Price (born 1930), Canadian writer
 Lily Inglis (1926–2010), Canadian architect
 Lily Irene Jackson (1848–1928), American artist and arts organizer
 Lily Isabel Maude Addison (1885–1968), Australian architect
 Lily James (born 1989), English actress
 Lily Jan (born 1947), Jack and DeLoris Lange Professor of Molecular Physiology at UC San Francisco
 Lily Ki (born 1991), American internet personality, voice actress, musician, and animator known as LilyPichu
 Lily Kann (1893–1978), German-born British actress
 Lily Kelly Napangardi (born c.1948), Australian Aboriginal artist
 Lily Kempson (1897–1996), Irish trade union activist
 Lily Kim (born 1980), Korean-American journalist
 Lily King (born 1963), American novelist
 Lily Koppel (born 1981), American writer
 Lily Koros Tare, Kenyan medical administrator
 Lily Kronberger (1890–1974), Hungarian figure skater
 Lily Kwok (1918–2007), Chinese-born restaurateur
 Lily Laight (born 2001), British child actress
 Lily Laita (born 1969), artist and art educator in New Zealand
 Lily Laskine (1893–1988), French harpist
 Lily Leung (1929–2019), actress in Hong Kong
 Lily Li (born 1950), Hong Kong actress
 Lily Lind (1882–1916), nurse from New Zealand who served in France in World War I
 Lily Lodge (born 1932), American actress, acting coach, and etiquette consultant
 Lily Loveless (born 1990), English actress
 Lily Luik (born 1985), Estonian long-distance runner
 Lily Lyoonjung Lee (born 1969), Korean-American competitive figure skater
 Lily Marinho (1921–2011), Brazilian television arts patron, philanthropist, and socialite
 Lily Mariye (born 1964), American actress
 Lily McNicholas (1909–1998), Irish nurse in the Second World War
 Lily Monteverde (born 1938), Filipino film producer
 Lily Neo (born 1953), Singaporean medical practitioner and politician
 Lily Oddie (1937–2021), Canadian provincial politician
 Lily Osman Adams (1865–1945), Canadian painter
 Lily Owsley (born 1994), English international field hockey player
 Lily Parr (1905–1978), English footballer
 Lily Pastré (1891–1974), French heiress and patron of the arts
 Lily Pons (1898–1976), French-American actress
 Lily Postlethwaite (born 2001), Australian rules footballer
 Lily Poulett-Harris (1873–1897), Australian sportswoman and educationalist
 Lily Pringsheim (1887–1954), German politician
 Lily Rabe (born 1982), American actress
 Lily Rani Biswas (born 1989), Bangladeshi women's cricketer
 Lily Renée (born 1925), Austrian-American artist
 Lily Ross Taylor (1886–1969), American academic and author
 Lily Safra (born 1938), Brazilian philanthropist
 Lily Saxby, British stage and film actress
 Lily Serna (born 1986), Australian mathematician and television presenter
 Lily Sobhani (born 1976), English live events producer
 Lily Spencer-Churchill, Duchess of Marlborough (1854–1909), American heiress and socialite
 Lily Sullivan, Australian actress
 Lily Tembo (1981–2009), Zambian musician, radio presenter, journalist, and charity worker
 Lily Thomas (1927–2019), Indian lawyer
 Lily Tien (born 1967), Taiwanese actress
 Lily Tobias (1887–1984), British writer and activist
 Lily Tomlin (born 1939), American actress
 Lily Tuck (born 1938), American novelist
 Lily van den Broecke (born 1992), British rower
 Lily Venson (1924–2011), American journalist
 Lily Wangchuk (born 1972), Bhutanese politician, diplomat, and activist
 Lily Weiding (1924–2021), Danish actress
 Lily C. Whitaker (1850–1932), American educator, writer
 Lily Yam (born 1947), Hong Kong civil servant and government official
 Lily Yeats (1866–1949), Irish embroiderer
 Lily Yeh (born 1941), Chinese American artist
 Lily Yip (born 1963), Chinese-born American table tennis player and coach
 Lily Young, professor of environmental microbiology at Rutgers, The State University of New Jersey in New Brunswick
 Lily Yulianti Farid (born 1971), Indonesian writer and journalist
 Lily Yuriko Nakai Havey (born 1932), American water color artist and author
 Lily Zhang (born 1996), American table tennis player

Fictional characters
 Lily, in the cartoon Kappa Mikey
 Lily, an advertising character for AT&T portrayed by Milana Vayntrub
 Lily Aldrin, in the American television series How I Met Your Mother
 Lily Bart, heroine of Edith Wharton's The House of Mirth
 Lily Bloom, in the romance “It Ends with Us”
Lily Brown, in the film Nanny McPhee
 Lily Butterfield in the British soap opera Emmerdale (2006–2008)
 Lily Cruz, in the Philippine soap opera Wildflower (2017-2018), portrayed by Maja Salvador
Lily Drinkwell, in the British soap opera Hollyoaks (2017–2019)
 Lily Duncan, from Canadian-French-Chinese children's animated television series Mona the Vampire
Lily Frankenstein, played by Billie Piper in the British-American TV series Penny Dreadful
 Lily Hollister, supervillain of comic book series Menace 
Lily Hoshikawa, a trans character from the MAPPA idol anime series Zombie Land Saga
 Lily Iglehart, a main character from the Netflix series Sex Education; portrayed by Tanya Reynolds
 Lily Keeble played by Nora Dunn in the film Max Keeble's Big Move
Lily Loud, one of the main characters in The Loud House
Lily Marlene, 'the girl under the lantern' in а popular WWII song 
Lily Munster played by Yvonne De Carlo in American TV series The Munsters (1964–1966)
 Lily Owens, main character in the novel and film The Secret Life of Bees
Lilith 'Lily' Page, Maleficent’s estranged daughter from the Netflix fantasy/adventure series Once Upon a Time
 Lily Potter (née Evans), Harry's mother in J. K. Rowling's Harry Potter series
 Lily Luna Potter, Harry's daughter in J. K. Rowling's Harry Potter series
 Lily Pritchett-Tucker in the American TV series Modern Family (debut 2010)
 Lily Randall, one of the main characters in the Canadian TV series Radio Free Roscoe; portrayed by Kate Todd
 Lily Ritter, in the video game State Of Decay
Lily Rowan, a recurring character in Rex Stout's Nero Wolfe series
 Lily Savage, a drag queen personality as portrayed by comedian Paul O'Grady
 Lily C. Sherbet, in Japanese anime/manga/sim (debut 2006)
 Lily Stone, Burnett's granddaughter in the film Thomas and the Magic Railroad
 Lily Strosek, in Magical Chronicle Lyrical Nanoha Force
Lily White, a mid boss in the Touhou Project video game
Lily Winters, in the American soap opera The Young and the Restless
 Lily van der Woodsen, in American TV series Gossip Girl
 Daisy, Lily, and Violet, Kanto Gym Leaders in Pokémon and Misty's sisters
 Lily, a Vocaloid mascot based on Yuri Masuda, Japanese vocalist of the musical group m.o.v.e
 Lily, a Longwing Dragon flown by Captain Harcourt and leader of Temeraire's formation in the Temeraire book series by Naomi Novik.
 Lily, co-protagonist of Glitter Force

Names with the same meaning  
Some equivalents for the name Lily from other cultures include: 
Kielo (Finnish)
Đurđica (Croatian)
Azucena (Spanish) 
Crina (Romanian) 
 Nari (Korean)
Yuri (Japanese)

See also
 Lili (disambiguation)
 Lille (disambiguation)
 Lilley (disambiguation)
 Lilli (disambiguation)
 Lillie (disambiguation)
 Lily (disambiguation)
 Lilly (disambiguation)

 Nari (Korean name), a Korean feminine name meaning "lily"
 Yuri (Japanese name), a Japanese feminine name meaning "lily"

References

English feminine given names
Given names derived from plants or flowers